Boula may refer to:

 Boula (music), any of several Caribbean drums
 Boula, Guinea, a town in the Kankan region
 Boula, Burkina Faso, a village in Gnagna Province
 Boula (writer) (died 1984), also known as Ikbal El Alaily, an Egyptian surrealist writer